The 2018–19 NCAA Division I men's basketball season began on November 6, 2018. The first tournament was the 2K Sports Classic and the season concluded with the Final Four in Minneapolis on April 8, 2019. Practices officially began on September 28, 2018. The season saw Zion Williamson dominate Player of the Year honors and media attention, while Virginia won its first NCAA Championship. The NCAA Championship Game between Virginia and Texas Tech would mark the final NCAA game with a 20-foot 9 inch three-point shot line, as it moved out to the FIBA standard of 22 feet and 2 inches the following year.

Rule changes
On February 22, 2019, the NCAA announced a set of experimental rules that it would use in the 2019 National Invitation Tournament.

The following rules were also used in the 2018 NIT:
 The free-throw lane was widened from the current college standard of 12 feet to the NBA standard of 16 feet.
 After an offensive rebound, the shot clock was reset to 20 seconds instead of the current NCAA standard of 30.

A set of rules relating to free throws that had been used in the 2017 NIT was used again in the 2019 edition, with one modification:
 Team foul counts, for purposes of determining bonus free throws, were reset to zero at the 10-minute mark of each half, effectively dividing the game into quarters for that purpose.
 The "one-and-one" was eliminated. All bonus free throw situations resulted in two free throws for the non-fouled team. This mirrored current practice in NCAA women's basketball, which has been played in quarters since the 2015–16 season.
 Teams entered the bonus upon the fifth team foul in each 10-minute segment.
 The team foul count was reset to zero at the start of any overtime period. Teams entered the bonus upon the fourth team foul in an overtime period.
 In a completely new feature, the NCAA adopted the NBA's bonus rule regarding team fouls in the last two minutes of any period. Teams entered the bonus on the second team foul in the last two minutes of a ten-minute segment or overtime period, regardless of the total team foul count at that point of the period.

Notes

Season headlines
 May 23, 2018 – The NCAA announced its Academic Progress Rate (APR) sanctions for the 2018–19 school year. A total of nine programs in eight sports were declared ineligible for postseason play due to failure to meet the required APR benchmark, including the following Division I men's basketball team:
Alabama A&M
 May 29 – Conference USA announced a new men's basketball scheduling format that took effect with the 2018–19 season. The league now plays an 18-game schedule formatted as follows:
 During the first 14 games of the conference season, each team plays its designated travel partner home-and-home, and single games against every other team.
 At this point, teams are placed into three groups based on their conference standings through 14 games, with the top five teams in one group, the next five in a second group, and the bottom four teams in the final group. Teams play within their grouping for the final four games of the conference season, with home and away games determined by a preset formula.
 Each team will be locked into a seed for the C-USA tournament that corresponds to its group. For example, teams in the top group will be assured the top five seeds. The specific seedings will be determined by conference record across the full league schedule.
 June 4 – The Sun Belt Conference announced a new men's basketball scheduling format similar to that announced by Conference USA the previous week. Effective with the 2019–20 season, the league was to have played a 20-game schedule formatted as follows:
 The conference would split into East and West Divisions for scheduling purposes, though this split would not affect overall league standings.
 East: Appalachian State, Coastal Carolina, Georgia Southern, Georgia State, South Alabama, Troy
 West: Arkansas State, Little Rock, Louisiana, Louisiana–Monroe, Texas State, UT Arlington
 For the first 16 games of the conference season, each team would play home-and-home against other divisional members and single games against teams in the other division.
 After 16 conference games, teams would be divided into four "pods" based on their conference standings at that time. The top three teams would be assigned to Pod A, the next three to Pod B, and so on through Pod D for the bottom three teams. The final four games for each team would be home-and-homes against the other two teams in that pod.
 Each team would be locked into a seed for the Sun Belt tournament that corresponds to its pod. For example, teams in Pod A would be assured the top three seeds. Unlike the C-USA system, the specific seed would be based strictly on standings in the final four conference games—not overall conference record.
 A year later, the conference announced that it would place almost all of these changes on hold. The only part of the plan that was implemented on the original schedule was expansion of the conference schedule to 20 games.
 June 18 – Purdue University Fort Wayne (PFW), which was set to begin operation on July 1 following the dissolution of Indiana University – Purdue University Fort Wayne (IPFW), announced that the athletic program that it would inherit from IPFW, previously known as the Fort Wayne Mastodons, would become the Purdue Fort Wayne Mastodons. PFW also changed its colors from IPFW's former blue and silver scheme to the old gold and black used by its new parent institution.
 August 8 – In response to the sport's ongoing corruption scandal, the NCAA announced a suite of major changes to its rules governing college basketball:
 Certain high school players and college players with remaining eligibility will now be allowed to have formal relationships with agents while retaining college eligibility. These agents must be certified by the NCAA. College players can be represented if they have formally requested an evaluation of their NBA prospects from the league. Should the NBA change the age limit for the draft to once again allow players to be drafted directly from high school, the rule also allows for high school players to be represented, effective on the July 1 before their senior year, if USA Basketball has designated them as "elite senior prospects". However, these relationships will be allowed only during the draft process, and must be terminated if the player returns to school.
 Certain players who declare for the NBA draft but are not selected will be free to return to their former schools, as long as they have not signed professional contracts, or have not complied with NCAA rules for relationships with agents, in the meantime. However, this privilege is only extended to players who have requested NBA evaluation of their draft prospects and have been invited to the NBA Draft Combine.
 School presidents, chancellors, and athletics staff members are now contractually required to comply with all NCAA investigations. This effectively gives the NCAA subpoena power in its investigations, which it previously lacked.
 Presidents and chancellors are now personally accountable to the NCAA for athletic department compliance with NCAA rules.
 The NCAA and its Committee on Infractions can now use information obtained in outside investigations in its infractions process. Previously, the NCAA could not use such information. 
 August 22 – The NCAA announced that effective immediately, the RPI will no longer be used in the selection process for the Division I men's tournament. It was replaced by the NCAA Evaluation Tool (NET), which takes into account the following:
 Game results
 Strength of schedule
 Location (home, away, or neutral site)
 Scoring margin—Teams will receive no added credit for victory margins above 10 points. Additionally, overtime games will be assigned a scoring margin of 1 point, regardless of the actual score.
 Net offensive and defensive efficiency
 Quality of wins and losses—The NCAA will continue to use its "quadrant" system, introduced for last year's tournament selection process, to classify individual wins and losses.
 All games will be evaluated equally; there is no bonus or penalty for when a game is played within the season.
 The NET was adopted only for men's basketball. All other sports that use selection committees to determine NCAA tournament entries, including the Division I women's basketball tournament, continue to use their own versions of the RPI.
 September 10 – The Northeast Conference (NEC) announced that Merrimack College would start a transition from the NCAA Division II Northeast-10 Conference and join the NEC effective July 1, 2019. The Warriors will not be eligible for the NCAA tournament until becoming a full D-I member in 2023–24.
 September 28 – LSU player Wayde Sims, set to play his junior season for the Tigers, was killed in a shooting near the Southern University campus in Baton Rouge, home to both schools.
 October 3 – Long Island University announced that it would merge its two current athletic programs—the LIU Brooklyn Blackbirds, full members of the NEC, and the Division II LIU Post Pioneers—effective with the 2019–20 school year. The new program will compete under the LIU name with a new nickname and maintain LIU Brooklyn's Division I and NEC memberships. This change will have minimal effect on the existing LIU Brooklyn men's basketball program, as LIU has announced that the unified basketball team will be based at the Brooklyn campus.
 October 23 – The Associated Press preseason All-American team was released. Purdue guard Carsen Edwards was the leading vote-getter (63 votes). Joining him on the team were North Carolina forward Luke Maye (52 votes), Duke guard R. J. Barrett (50), Kansas forward Dedric Lawson (30), Wisconsin forward Ethan Happ (23) and Nevada forward Caleb Martin (23).
 January 11, 2019 – The Western Athletic Conference announced that Dixie State University  would start a transition from Division II and join the conference in July 2020.
 January 19 – The last two undefeated teams lost. First, Michigan suffered a 54-64 point loss at Wisconsin. Later on in the day, Virginia lost on the road to Duke by the score of 72–70.
 February 13 – Florida A&M announces four athletic teams, including men's basketball, are ineligible for postseason play due to failure to meet the APR multi-year threshold.
 February 20
 North Carolina's 88–72 upset of top-ranked Duke was overshadowed by a freak injury suffered by superstar Duke freshman Zion Williamson. On the Blue Devils' first possession of the game, Williamson's left shoe catastrophically failed, with the sole completely separating from the midsole. Williamson suffered a sprained right knee in the incident, and did not return to the game. The following day, the injury was confirmed to be minor; although Williamson was listed as day-to-day immediately after the injury, he did not return to action until the Blue Devils' ACC tournament opener on March 14.
 On his way home from a postgame meal after Syracuse's 69–49 upset of Louisville, Orange head coach Jim Boeheim was involved in a fatal car accident. A car crashed on Interstate 690 in Syracuse, and the occupants attempted to cross over to the median. Boeheim hit one of them while swerving to avoid those with disabilities vehicle, and the victim died in a local hospital. Neither driver involved in the incident was found to be impaired, and Syracuse's police chief initially indicated that no charges would be filed in the case.
 March 5 – Kansas was eliminated from the race for the Big 12 Conference regular-season title with an 81–68 loss at Oklahoma, ending the Jayhawks' streak of consecutive conference regular-season titles at a Division I men's record of 14.
 March 7 – The district attorney for Onondaga County, New York issued his report on the fatal car accident in which Jim Boeheim was involved. According to the report, the disabled vehicle did not have lights on, and also had inoperable rear marker lights. Additionally, the passengers of that vehicle, including the individual who was struck and killed, were wearing dark clothing. Boeheim was officially cleared of wrongdoing, and no charges would be filed against anyone involved.
 March 8 – In further fallout from the corruption scandal, LSU suspended head coach Will Wade indefinitely. This action came the day after it was revealed that FBI wiretaps had intercepted calls between Wade and Christian Dawkins, an aspiring agent who had been convicted on federal felony charges relating to the corruption scandal, during one of which Wade referenced a "strong-ass offer" made to a recruit.
 March 15 – Long Island University announced that its merged athletic program would compete as the LIU Sharks.
 April 14 – Will Wade was reinstated as LSU head coach after a meeting between the LSU athletic department, Wade, and NCAA compliance officials.

Milestones and records
 During the season, the following players reached the 2,000 career point milestone – Marshall guard Jon Elmore, Montana State guard Tyler Hall, Wofford guard Fletcher Magee, Cornell guard Matt Morgan, Lipscomb guard Garrison Mathews, Georgia Southern guard Tookie Brown, Eastern Kentucky forward Nick Mayo, Northern Colorado guard Jordan Davis, Hofstra guard Justin Wright-Foreman, Wisconsin forward Ethan Happ, Charlotte guard Jon Davis, UNC Greensboro guard Francis Alonso, Purdue Fort Wayne guard John Konchar, Appalachian State guard Ronshad Shabazz, Northern Kentucky forward Drew McDonald, Nevada swingman Jordan Caroline, Wyoming guard Justin James, Mississippi State guard Quinndary Weatherspoon, and Clemson guard Marcquise Reed.
 Konchar additionally became the first Division I men's player with 2,000 points, 1,000 rebounds, 500 assists and 200 steals in his career. 
 Two players reached the 3,000-point milestone in February. First, Campbell guard Chris Clemons reached the mark on February 16 in the Fighting Camels' 76–71 loss to Presbyterian. Then, on February 23, South Dakota State forward Mike Daum reached the mark in the Jackrabbits' 94–89 win over South Dakota.
 November 12 – Buffalo was ranked 25th in the AP top 25 poll - signifying the first time in school history that the program cracked the top 25.
 November 24 – High Point head coach Tubby Smith won his 600th career Division I game, as his Panthers defeated East Carolina 55–52.
 December 3—Furman was ranked 25th in the AP top 25 poll - signifying the first time in school history that the program cracked the top 25.
 December 7—Mike Daum became the Summit League's all-time leading scorer. In a 42-point outing against Southern, Daum passed former Oral Roberts forward Caleb Green's conference record 2,504 points.
 December 21 – Chris Clemons of Campbell became the Big South Conference's all-time leading scorer. He passed VMI guard Reggie Williams' 2,556 career points for the honor.
 January 19 – Montana State's Tyler Hall became the Big Sky Conference all-time leading scorer, breaking a mark of 2,169 set the previous season by Bogdan Bliznyuk of Eastern Washington.
 February 23 – Syracuse drew a crowd of 35,642 in the Carrier Dome for its 75–65 loss to then top-ranked Duke, breaking the school's own record attendance of 35,446 for an on-campus college basketball game. Not only was this a record, it was also greater than the home attendances of more than half of Division I men's teams in the entire regular season (180 out of 353).
 February 25 – Wofford made the AP top 25 for the first time in the school's history, entering the poll at #24.
 March 3 – Marshall guard Jon Elmore became the Conference USA all-time leading scorer, passing UTEP's Stefon Jackson. Earlier in the season, Elmore became the conference's all-time assist leader (passing UTEP's Julyan Stone), making him the only player currently leading a conference in both categories all-time.
 Later in the season (March 26), in a quarterfinal match of the CollegeInsider Postseason tournament, Elmore made three 3-pointers to become Conference USA's all-time leader in that category. He surpassed the previous record of 345 set by Charlotte's Jobey Thomas in 2002. 
 March 15 – Michigan State head coach Tom Izzo won his 600th career Division I game as the Spartans defeated Ohio State 77–70 in the quarterfinals of the Big Ten Conference tournament.
 March 16 – Washington guard Matisse Thybulle broke former Oregon State star Gary Payton's 29 year-old Pac-12 Conference career steals record as he collected his 322nd steal in the Huskies' Pac-12 tournament final loss to Oregon.
 March 20 – Wichita State head coach Gregg Marshall won his 500th career Division I game as the Shockers defeated Furman 76–70 in the 1st round of the NIT.
 March 21 – The first day of the first round of the NCAA tournament saw one significant milestone achieved and one major record broken:
 First, in an afternoon West Regional game, Murray State's Ja Morant became the first player with a triple-double in the NCAA tournament since Draymond Green in 2012, with 17 points, 11 rebounds, and 16 assists in the Racers' 83–64 win over Marquette.
 Then, in a late-evening Midwest Regional game, Wofford's Fletcher Magee became the Division I career leader in three-pointers, surpassing Oakland's Travis Bader in the Terriers' 84–68 win over Seton Hall. Magee's seven three-pointers gave him 509 for his career to Bader's previous record of 504. This was also Wofford's first-ever NCAA tournament win.

Conference membership changes
Six schools joined new conferences for the 2018–19 season. Four schools switched between Division I conferences for the 2018–19 season. In addition, two schools moved from Division II starting this season and are ineligible for NCAA-sponsored postseason play until completing their D-I transitions in 2022.

In addition to the schools changing conferences, the 2018–19 season was the last for Savannah State in D-I with its decision to reclassify all of its sports to D-II.

Also, one D-I member adopted a new institutional and athletic identity. The 2017–18 school year was the last for Indiana University – Purdue University Fort Wayne (IPFW) as a single institution; the school's health sciences programs were taken over by Indiana University as Indiana University Fort Wayne, while all other academic programs are now governed by Purdue University as Purdue University Fort Wayne (PFW). As noted previously, the former IPFW athletic program was inherited by PFW and is now known as the Purdue Fort Wayne Mastodons.

Arenas

New arenas
 Elon began play at the new Schar Center, which replaced their home of 69 seasons, Alumni Gym.
 Marquette along with the NBA's Milwaukee Bucks moved into the new Fiserv Forum, which replaced Bradley Center after 30 years.
 After 32 seasons at the off-campus Burton Coliseum, McNeese State opened the new on-campus Health and Human Performance Education Complex (H&HP Complex).
 The two new Division I entries for 2018 continued to play at existing on-campus facilities. California Baptist plays at the CBU Events Center, which opened in 2017, and North Alabama plays at Flowers Hall, their home since 1972.

Arenas reopening
Four teams returned to newly renovated arenas, all of which were closed for the 2017–18 season.
 Cincinnati returned to Fifth Third Arena.
 Houston initially planned to reopen the renamed Fertitta Center (originally Hofheinz Pavilion) by the start of the 2018–19 season, but the new arena did not open until December 1, 2018, six games into the season. The Cougars' first game in the renovated facility was a 65–61 upset of then-#18 Oregon.
 Northwestern returned to Welsh–Ryan Arena.
 Villanova returned the bulk of its schedule to the renamed Finneran Pavilion (originally duPont Pavilion and later The Pavilion).

Arenas closing

Temporary arenas
 With the reopening of Fertitta Center delayed, Houston began the 2018–19 season at Texas Southern's Health and Physical Education Arena, where the Cougars played most of their 2017–18 home games.
 Due to delays in the construction of the new UPMC Events Center, originally scheduled to open in January 2019 but since delayed to that summer, Robert Morris played its entire home schedule at the Student Recreation and Fitness Center, a facility that opened in 2017 at the on-campus North Athletic Complex as part of the UPMC Events Center project.

Season outlook

Pre–season polls

 
The top 25 from the AP and USA Today Coaches Polls.

Regular season

Early season tournaments

Upsets
An upset is a victory by an underdog team. In the context of NCAA Division I Men's Basketball this generally constitutes an unranked team defeating a team currently ranked In the Top 25. This list will highlight those upsets of ranked teams by unranked teams as well as upsets of #1 teams. Rankings are from the AP poll.

Bold type indicates winning teams in "true road games"-i.e., those played on an opponent's home court (including secondary homes, such as Intrust Bank Arena for Wichita State).

In addition to the above listed upsets in which an unranked team defeated a ranked team, there were six non-Division I teams to defeat a Division I team this season. Bold type indicates winning teams in "true road games"—i.e., those played on an opponent's home court (including secondary homes).

Conference winners and tournaments
Each of the 32 Division I athletic conferences ends its regular season with a single-elimination tournament. The team with the best regular-season record in each conference is given the number one seed in each tournament, with tiebreakers used as needed in the case of ties for the top seeding. The winners of these tournaments receive automatic invitations to the 2019 NCAA Division I men's basketball tournament.

Statistical leaders

Postseason

NCAA tournament

Tournament upsets
For this list, an "upset" is defined as a win by a team seeded 7 or more spots below its defeated opponent.

NIT tournament

CBI tournament

CIT tournament

Conference standings

Award winners

2019 Consensus All-America team

Major player of the year awards
Wooden Award: Zion Williamson, Duke
Naismith Award: Zion Williamson, Duke
Associated Press Player of the Year: Zion Williamson, Duke
NABC Player of the Year: Zion Williamson, Duke
Oscar Robertson Trophy (USBWA): Zion Williamson, Duke
Sporting News Player of the Year: Zion Williamson, Duke

Major freshman of the year awards
Wayman Tisdale Award (USBWA): Zion Williamson, Duke
 NABC Freshman of the Year: Zion Williamson, Duke
Sporting News Freshman of the Year: Zion Williamson, Duke

Major coach of the year awards
Associated Press Coach of the Year: Chris Beard, Texas Tech 
Henry Iba Award (USBWA): Rick Barnes, Tennessee
NABC Coach of the Year: Matt Painter, Purdue
Naismith College Coach of the Year: Rick Barnes, Tennessee
 Sporting News Coach of the Year: Mike Young, Wofford

Other major awards
Bob Cousy Award (Best point guard): Ja Morant, Murray State
Jerry West Award (Best shooting guard): RJ Barrett, Duke
Julius Erving Award (Best small forward): Rui Hachimura, Gonzaga
Karl Malone Award (Best power forward): Zion Williamson, Duke
Kareem Abdul-Jabbar Award (Best center): Ethan Happ, Wisconsin
Pete Newell Big Man Award (Best big man): Ethan Happ, Wisconsin
NABC Defensive Player of the Year: De'Andre Hunter, Virginia
 Naismith Defensive Player of the Year: Matisse Thybulle, Washington
Senior CLASS Award (top senior on and off the court): Luke Maye, North Carolina
Robert V. Geasey Trophy (Top player in Philadelphia Big 5): Phil Booth, Villanova
Haggerty Award (Top player in New York City metro area): Myles Powell, Seton Hall
Ben Jobe Award (Top minority coach): James Jones, Yale
Hugh Durham Award (Top mid-major coach): Darian DeVries, Drake
Jim Phelan Award (Top head coach): Ritchie McKay, Liberty
Lefty Driesell Award (Top defensive player): Matisse Thybulle, Washington
Lou Henson Award (Top mid-major player): Fletcher Magee, Wofford
Lute Olson Award (Top non-freshman or transfer player): Ja Morant, Murray State
Skip Prosser Man of the Year Award (Coach with moral character): Robert Jones, Norfolk State
Academic All-American of the Year (Top scholar-athlete): Joe Sherburne, UMBC
Elite 90 Award (Top GPA among upperclass players at Final Four): Davide Moretti, Texas Tech
USBWA Most Courageous Award: The 2019 men's award was not presented to a figure involved with the Division I game. This year's recipient was involved with the NCAA Division II game—namely Ericka Downey, wife of Northeastern State men's head coach Mike Downey.

Coaching changes
Several teams changed coaches during and after the season.

See also
2018–19 NCAA Division I women's basketball season

References